"I've Got the Music in Me" is a pop song by The Kiki Dee Band, released in 1974. It was written in 1973 by Bias Boshell, Kiki Dee Band's keyboardist. It is also the title of a Kiki Dee Band album released in 1974 and re-mastered and re-issued with bonus tracks in 2008.

Background
The song is upbeat, describing in various ways how the singer will not be deterred or impeded in their goals, because they possess the quality of 'having the music' in them.
This song is noted for its false ending, making the listeners think that the song is over, before the repeated refrains of the song's title bring the song to a fade-out.

Chart performance
The song entered the UK Singles Chart on 7 September 1974, reached number 19 and stayed in the chart for eight weeks.
On the Billboard pop chart in the United States, "I've Got the Music in Me" peaked at number 12 on November 30, 1974.

Chart history

Weekly charts

Year-end charts

Personnel
 Kiki Dee – Vocals
Joshie Armstead, Cissy Houston, Maeretha Stewart, Paul Vigrass – Backing vocals
Mike Deacon – Organ
Roger Pope – percussion, tambourine
 Jo Partridge – Electric guitar
Bias Boshell – Piano, electric piano
 Phil Curtis – Bass guitar
 Peter Clarke – Drums
 Phil Dunne – Engineer
Gus Dudgeon – Producer
 Clive Franks – Assistant producer

Cover versions

Cascade ("Musiikkisielu") (1975) 
Lainie Kazan (1975)
Barbi Benton (1975)
Marcia Hines (1976), (1978) and (1999) 
Thelma Houston (1976)
New Seekers (1976)
Zdzisława Sośnicka (1976, titled "Moja muzyka to ja" in Polish) 
The Brady Bunch Variety Hour (1976 TV show)
Heart (1977 and 1978, recorded in 1975)
Tina Turner & Cher (1977, on the TV show "The Sonny & Cher Show")
Ronnie Milsap (1978)
Sheena Easton (1979)
Ronnie Milsap (1979)
Aretha Franklin (1977, as a medley with "Mumbles", from the album Sweet Passion)
Jump5 (2004)
Diana DeGarmo (2004)
Boogie Pimps (2006)
Céline Dion (2008)
Jennifer Lopez (2012)
Tygers of Pan Tang (2016)
Jane Levy (2020)

References

External links

Kiki Dee Info

1974 songs
1974 singles
Kiki Dee songs
Song recordings produced by Gus Dudgeon
The Rocket Record Company singles
Songs about music